Charles Thomas Scott, also known as Shaheed Abdul-Aleem, (born December 15, 1948) is an American former professional basketball player. He played two seasons in the American Basketball Association (ABA) and eight seasons in the National Basketball Association (NBA). Scott was an Olympic Gold Medalist and was inducted into the Naismith Memorial Basketball Hall of Fame in 2018.

Early life
Scott was born in New York City and grew up primarily in Harlem, New York. There, his father was a cab driver.

A 6'5" (1.96 m) guard/forward, Scott attended Stuyvesant High School in New York City for one year before transferring to Laurinburg Institute in Laurinburg, North Carolina. Scott transferred to Laurinburg which was famous at the time for preparing basketball players for college. Scott said, "It had a well-known basketball program. I knew my family wouldn't be able to afford college, so a scholarship was going to be my ticket." Scott was valedictorian of his high school senior class. He was also a legend at Rucker Park.

While in high school, Scott spent one summer at a basketball program at Davidson College with coach Lefty Driesell. Driesell recruited Scott who was accepted for early admission at Davidson. However, Scott also explored Duke University, North Carolina State University, the University of North Carolina at Chapel Hill, and Wake Forest University at the suggestion of his coach at Laurinburg. He ultimately accepted the offer to play at UNC because he felt that, as a larger public university, it would be more open to a black player "breaking the color barrier".

College career
Scott played college basketball at the University of North Carolina at Chapel Hill (UNC) where he was the first black scholarship athlete. Scott averaged 22.1 points and 7.1 rebounds per game at UNC, and a career-best 27.1 points per game in his senior season. He was a two-time All-American and a three-time all-Atlantic Coast Conference selection. Scott led UNC to their second and third consecutive NCAA Final Four appearances in 1968 and 1969.

Woody Durham, a long-time radio announcer for UNC basketball said, "He really was something. He was the first Carolina player that really would compare to today's player. His build, his speed, his ability—you could take him out of the late 1960s and drop him into today's game, and he wouldn't miss a beat."

In addition to breaking the color barrier in UNC basketball, he was also the first African-American to pledge a fraternity at UNC, accepting an offer to join St. Anthony Hall, in 1967. However, after three weeks after pledging, withdrew from the fraternity because of his demanding basketball schedule.

Scott was a gold medalist at the 1968 Summer Olympics playing for the 1968 United States men's Olympic basketball team. Scott was the fourth leading scorer on the team (8.0) coached by Henry Iba.

Professional career
Scott was drafted by the Boston Celtics in 1970 but he had already signed a contract with the Virginia Squires of the American Basketball Association (ABA). Scott was named ABA Rookie of the Year after averaging 27.1 points per game. During his second season with the Squires, he set the ABA record for the highest scoring average in one season (34.6 points per game). However, he became dissatisfied with life in the ABA and joined the NBA's Phoenix Suns in 1972. The Suns traded Paul Silas to the Celtics after the season in order to keep him.  At that point, he briefly went by the name Shaheed Abdul-Aleem.

Scott continued his stellar play in the NBA, representing the Suns in three straight NBA All-Star Games (1973, 1974, and 1975), then was traded to the Boston Celtics for Paul Westphal and two draft picks. With the Celtics in the 1975-76 NBA season, Scott won a championship ring against the Suns. Scott later played for the Los Angeles Lakers and Denver Nuggets. He retired in 1980 with 14,837 combined ABA/NBA career points.

He was inducted into the Naismith Memorial Basketball Hall of Fame in 2018.

ABA and NBA statistics

Regular season

|-
| style="text-align:left; | 
| style="text-align:left;"| Virginia (ABA)
| 84 || – || 37.9 || .463 || .246 || .746 || 5.2 || 5.6 || – || – || 27.1
|-
| style="text-align:left" | 
| style="text-align:left;"| Virginia (ABA)
| 73 || – || 41.9 ||.449 || .264 || .803 || 5.1 || 4.8 || – || – ||bgcolor="EOCEF2"| 34.6
|-
| style="text-align:left;"| 
| style="text-align:left;"| Phoenix
| 6 || – || 29.5 || .425 || – || .810 || 3.8 || 4.3 || – || – || 18.8
|-
| style="text-align:left;"|
| style="text-align:left;"| Phoenix
| 81 || – || 37.8 || .446 || – || .784 || 4.2 || 6.1 || – || – || 25.3
|-
| style="text-align:left;"|
| style="text-align:left;"| Phoenix
| 52 || – || 38.5 || .459 || – || .781 || 4.3 || 5.2 || 1.9 || 0.4 || 25.4
|-
| style="text-align:left;"| 
| style="text-align:left;"| Phoenix
| 69 || – || 37.6 || .441 || – || .781 || 4.0 || 4.5 || 1.6 || 0.3 || 24.3
|-
| style="text-align:left;background:#afe6ba;"| †
| style="text-align:left;"| Boston
| 82 || – || 35.5 || .449 || – || .797 || 4.4 || 4.2 || 1.3 || 0.3 || 17.6
|-
| style="text-align:left;"| 
| style="text-align:left;"| Boston
| 43 || – || 36.8 || .444 || – || .746 || 4.4 || 4.6 || 1.4 || 0.3 || 18.2
|-
| style="text-align:left;"| 
| style="text-align:left;"| Boston
| 31 || – || 34.8 || .433 || –  || .712 || 3.3 || 4.6 || 1.6 || 0.2 || 16.3
|-
| style="text-align:left;"| 
| style="text-align:left;"| L.A. Lakers
| 48 || – || 29.0 || .442 || – || .775 || 3.1 || 4.9 || 1.2 || 0.2 || 11.7
|-
| style="text-align:left;"| 
| style="text-align:left;"| Denver
| 79 || – || 29.0 || .442 || – || .775 || 3.1 || 4.9 || 1.2 || 0.4 || 12.0
|-
| style="text-align:left;"| 
| style="text-align:left;"| Denver
| 69 || – || 33.1 || .460 || .182 || .749 || 2.7 || 5.4 || 1.2 || 0.3 || 9.3
|-
|- class="sortbottom"
| style="text-align:center;" colspan=2| Career
| 717 || – || 35.6 || .448 || .253 || .773 || 4.0 || 4.9 || 1.3 || 0.3 || 20.7

Playoffs

|-
| style="text-align:left;"|  1971
| style="text-align:left;"|  Virginia (ABA)
| 12 || – || 42.0 || .409 || .258 || .755 || 6.6 || 6.8 || – || – || 26.8
|-
| style="text-align:left;background:#afe6ba;"| 1976†
| style="text-align:left;"| Boston
| 18 || – || 35.1 || .391 || – || .764 || 4.2 || 3.9 || 1.2 || 0.4 || 15.4
|-
| style="text-align:left;"| 1977
| style="text-align:left;"| Boston
| 9 || – || 37.6 || .406 || –  || .846 || 4.2 || 4.2 || 1.4 || 0.2 || 16.4
|-
| style="text-align:left;"| 1978
| style="text-align:left;"| L.A. Lakers
| 3 || – || 34.3 || .300 || –  || .750 || 4.3 || 4.7 || 1.3 || 0.0 || 10.0
|-
| style="text-align:left;"| 1979
| style="text-align:left;"| Denver
| 3 || – || 34.7 || .476 || –  || .571 || 4.7 || 3.3 || 0.7 || 0.7 || 16.0
|-
|-
|- class="sortbottom"
| style="text-align:center;" colspan=2| Career
| 45 || – || 37.4 || .400 || .258 || .766 || 4.9 || 4.8 || 1.2 || 0.4 || 18.3

Personal life
While attending the University of North Carolina at Chapel Hill Charlie Scott married Margaret Holmes. They had a daughter, Holly Scott Emanuel.

Scott and his current wife, Trudy, have three children—sons Shaun Scott and Shannon Dean Scott and daughter Simone Scott—and have lived primarily in Atlanta and Los Angeles. They currently live in Columbus, Ohio, where son Shannon used to play for the Ohio State Buckeyes.

After retiring from the NBA, Scott served as a marketing director for the sports apparel company Champion for several years, then as executive vice president of CTS, a telemarketing firm, before owning his own business.

See also
 Basketball in the United States

References

External links

1948 births
Living people
African-American basketball players
All-American college men's basketball players
American men's basketball players
Basketball players at the 1968 Summer Olympics
Boston Celtics draft picks
Boston Celtics players
Denver Nuggets players
Los Angeles Lakers players
Medalists at the 1968 Summer Olympics
Naismith Memorial Basketball Hall of Fame inductees
National Basketball Association All-Stars
North Carolina Tar Heels men's basketball players
Olympic gold medalists for the United States in basketball
Phoenix Suns players
Point guards
Shooting guards
Stuyvesant High School alumni
United States men's national basketball team players
Virginia Squires draft picks
Virginia Squires players
21st-century African-American people
20th-century African-American sportspeople
St. Anthony Hall
Basketball players from New York City